"Jenny kiss'd Me" (original title: Rondeau) is a poem by the English essayist Leigh Hunt. It was first published in November 1838 by the Monthly Chronicle.

The poem — per its original title, a rondeau — was inspired by Jane Welsh, the wife of Thomas Carlyle. According to anthologist Martin Gardner, "Jenny kiss'd Me" was written during a flu epidemic, and refers to an unexpected visit by the recovered Hunt to the Carlyle household and being greeted by Jenny.


Poem

The complete poem is:

The poem was deemed worthy of inclusion in The Oxford Book of English Verse, Hazel Felleman's Best-Loved Poems of the American People, and Martin Gardner's Best Remembered Poems.

Gardner adds that Paul Dehn parodied the poem by changing its last two lines to "Say I've had a filthy cold/Since Jenny kiss'd me."

Cultural references

In Jennifer Worth's book, Shadows of the Workhouse, an edited version of the poem is included at the beginning of a chapter. Sister Monica Joan recites the poem to midwife Jenny Lee in season 3 of Call the Midwife.

The poem is featured in the 1982 Serbian film A Tight Spot during an English class and was also  quoted in the elevator in the 2015 film The Age of Adaline, when Ellis first met Adaline.

In The Twilight Zone episode "The Fugitive," Old Ben quotes the poem to Jenny after she gives him a kiss.

Grandpa Amos McCoy (played by Walter Brennan), recites the last four lines of the poem at the end of the Season 2 episode ("Do You Kiss Your Wife") of The Real McCoys, while Grandpa Zebulon Walton (played by Will Geer), recites the poem in Season 2 Episode 24 of "The Waltons" entitled "The Five-Foot Shelf" (1974)

The first seven lines are quoted at the end of chapter 16 of John Dickson Carr’s “To Wake the Dead” (first published 1938).

References

English poems